Auf Ewig is a 2007 "best of" album by Joachim Witt. Also inside, is a bonus DVD containing music videos and interviews. Two new songs were made for this album, "Unsere Welt" and "Weh-Oh-Weh". The remainder of the album was remastered with some remixes.

The album peaked at position 36 in the German Media Control Charts.

Track listing 

Goldener Reiter (Neuzeit Mix)
Ich Spreng den Tag!
Eisenherz
Jetzt und Ehedem
Hundert Leiber
Die Flut
Herbergsvater (Tri-Tra-Trul-La-La) (Danzmusik Mix)
Und Ich Lauf
Wem Gehort das Sternenlicht?
Das Geht Tief
Unsere Welt  "Our World" 
Supergestort und Superversaut (Oomph!-Remix)
Batallion D'Amour
Weh-Oh-Weh  "Woe-Oh-Woe" 
Wo Versteckt Sich Gott?
Immer Noch

Bonus DVD 

The bonus DVD contains music videos from the Bayreuth 1-3, Eisenherz and POP albums. The interviews are in German and no other subtitles are available.

Die Flut (feat. Peter Heppner)
Bataillon D' Amour
Und Ich Lauf
Das Geht Tief
Goldener Reiter (Neuzeit Mix)
Wem Gehort Das Sternrnlicht?
Wo Versteckt Sich Gott?
Stay?
Herbergsvater (Ti-Tra-Trul-La-La) (Danzmusik Mix)
Fur Den Moment
Eisenherz
Interviews

References

2007 albums
Joachim Witt albums